Dawn Buckingham (February 21, 1968) is Land Commissioner of Texas. She was elected in November 2022 and sworn in on January 10, 2023. She was a state Senator from 2017 to 2023. She worked as a surgeon before being elected Land Commissioner. She is the first woman in the state of Texas history to serve as Land Commissioner.

Background
Buckingham is a seventh-generation Texan. Buckingham grew up in League City, Texas, before moving to Austin. She attended Westlake High School. She attended college at the University of Texas at Austin, and medical school at the University of Texas Medical Branch in Galveston, Texas.

Buckingham is married to Ed Buckingham; they are both practicing physicians, herself as a oculoplastic surgeon.

Buckingham was a school board member of the Lake Travis Independent School District from 2014 to 2015. She was also an appointee to the Texas Sunset Advisory Commission and the vice chair of the Texas State Board for Educator Certification.

Political career

2016 Texas Senate election
The district stretches from the Austin suburbs in Travis County, West to Texas Hill Country, and North to Abilene covering roughly 20,000 square miles of territory. Buckingham was one of six candidates in the Republican primary to replace retiring state senator Troy Fraser. Buckingham portrayed herself as a political outsider and was endorsed by former governor Rick Perry. In the March 1, 2016, primary she received 25% of the vote, with state representative Susan King of Abilene receiving 27% of the vote. Because neither candidate received a majority, they advanced to a runoff election in May. After a contentious campaign focusing on the records and geographic profiles of the two candidates, Buckingham won the runoff with over 60% of the vote.

In the November general election, Buckingham faced Democratic nominee Virginia “Jennie Lou” Leeder of Llano. Buckingham won with over 70% of the vote.

Texas Senate
Buckingham filed her first bill to subject faithless presidential electors to a civil penalty of $5,000 and to bar them from being electors in the future.  The American Conservative Union has given her a 96% lifetime rating.

2022 Texas Land Commissioner campaign

On June 6, 2021, Buckingham announced a run for Texas Land Commissioner in 2022. She became the Republican nominee after winning the May 24, 2022, runoff.

References

External links
Official campaign website
Official legislative website

1968 births
21st-century American politicians
21st-century American women politicians
American ophthalmologists
Commissioners of the General Land Office of Texas
Living people
People from Lakeway, Texas
People from Rockwall, Texas
Physicians from Texas
School board members in Texas
Republican Party Texas state senators
University of Texas at Austin alumni
University of Texas Medical Branch alumni
Women ophthalmologists
Women state legislators in Texas